Apocoptoma chabrillaci is a species of beetle in the family Cerambycidae, and the only species in the genus Apocoptoma. It was described by Thomson in 1857.

References

Onciderini
Beetles described in 1857